Triaxial may refer to:

 Triaxial cable (electrical cable)
 Triaxial ellipsoid (mathematics, geometric shapes)
 Triaxial test (Geotechnical engineering)